Cymothoe haynae is a butterfly in the family Nymphalidae. It is found in Cameroon, Gabon, the Republic of the Congo, the Central African Republic, the DRC and Uganda.

Subspecies
C. h. haynae (southern Democratic Republic of the Congo)
C. h. diphyia Karsch, 1894 (eastern Cameroon, northern Congo, Central African Republic, western Uganda, Democratic Republic of the Congo: Ituri, Ruwenzori and Kivu)
C. h. fumosa Staudinger, 1896 (Democratic Republic of the Congo)
C. h. superba Aurivillius, 1899 (southern and western Cameroon, Gabon)
C. h. vosiana Overlaet, 1942 (Democratic Republic of the Congo: south-central to the Kasai Valley)

References

Butterflies described in 1887
Cymothoe (butterfly)
Butterflies of Africa
Taxa named by Hermann Dewitz